Dale Edward Memmelaar (January 15, 1937 – March 17, 2009) was an American football  offensive lineman in the National Football League for the Chicago/St. Louis Cardinals, Dallas Cowboys, Cleveland Browns, and Baltimore Colts. He played college football at the University of Wyoming.

Early years
Memmelaar attended Goshen Central High School in Goshen, New York. He also practiced baseball, basketball and track.

He accepted a football scholarship from the University of Wyoming, where he was a three-year starter at offensive tackle. In 1956, he contributed to the team finishing with a 10-0 record.

As a senior he was named team captain, contributing to the Skyline Conference Championship and the 14-6 defeat of Hardin–Simmons University in the Sun Bowl. He also was a pro-baseball prospect as a pitcher.

Professional career

Chicago/St. Louis Cardinals
Memmelaar was selected in the twenty-first round (242nd overall) of the 1959 NFL Draft by the Chicago Cardinals. He was a backup player at offensive tackle and offensive guard. In 1961, his military service caused him to miss 4 games.

In August 1962, he was traded to the Minnesota Vikings in exchange for a draft choice (not exercised). He was returned to the Cardinals after two weeks and was promptly waived.

Dallas Cowboys
In September 1962, he was claimed off waivers by the Dallas Cowboys and he became a starter at right guard for two years. He also served as the team's barber. He was released on August 17, 1964.

Cleveland Browns
On August 20, 1964, he was signed as a free agent by the Cleveland Browns. He was a reserve pulling guard for running back Jim Brown. He helped win the NFL Championship 27-0 against the Baltimore Colts. The next year, the Browns again reached the NFL Championship game, but lost 12-23 against the Green Bay Packers.

Atlanta Falcons
Memmelaar was selected by the Atlanta Falcons in the 1966 NFL expansion draft. On June 21, 1966, he was traded to the Baltimore Colts in exchange for a sixth round draft choice (#151-Martine Bircher).

Baltimore Colts
In 1966, he was acquired to provide depth in case Alex Sandusky retired. Memmelaar was a reserve player with the Baltimore Colts for two years. In 1967, he was on the Colts' reserve squad while recuperating from a knee injury, until being activated on December 8, to replace the retired Jim Parker.

Personal life
Dale Memmelaar was one of 10 children, nine boys and one girl. Son of John and Claire (Dale) Memmelaar. Memmelaar grew up in Goshen, New York on Arcadia Farms. He started his day early moving hay and taking care of the farm, and he ended it late after practice.

Once graduated from Goshen High School, Dale played for the University of Wyoming. He was a captain of the team and also the teams barber. After retiring from playing football, Memmelaar worked as an assistant football coach and teacher at Newburgh Free Academy and then as a teacher, head football coach, assistant principal and athletic director at Washingtonville High School.

He was married and had two children. Memmelaar was a born again Christian. He went to Christian Faith Fellowship Church in Middletown, New York.

References

External links
NFL only part of Memmelaar's life
Memmelaar obituary

1937 births
2009 deaths
People from Hawthorne, New Jersey
People from Goshen, New York
Players of American football from New Jersey
Sportspeople from Passaic County, New Jersey
American football offensive linemen
Wyoming Cowboys football players
Chicago Cardinals players
St. Louis Cardinals (football) players
Dallas Cowboys players
Cleveland Browns players
Baltimore Colts players